Carolina Rivas Suárez (born March 4, 1978) is a Dominican singer, actress and theatre producer.

She has received several awards and nominations, including her win for Premios Casandra in 2009 as producer of the Santo Domingo adaptation of the musical Les Misérables.

Early life
Carolina was born in Santo Domingo, Dominican Republic. Her father, Nandy Rivas, is an advertising executive who conceived the famous 1980's Ron Barceló's commercials "Somos Un Pueblo Que Canta" and "Mi Pueblo Natal", considered by many the best ad campaigns ever made in the country; with music by Juan Luis Guerra, among others. Her mother, Cristina Suárez, is of Spanish descent.

She studied ballet and sang in a choir while in school. She graduated magna cum laude in advertising at Universidad Iberoamericana (UNIBE), but never really exercised her profession for long; she went after her actress and dancing career.

Career
In 2004 Carolina joined Tomás Álvarez (Toque Profundo) in the Cerobit project, in which she also was co-author of most of the songs. Some time later, Carolina left the band to concentrate on her career as an actress.

In 2005 she was invited to sing along with the world-renowned tenor Francisco Casanova in her show Cuando se quiere de veras.

At the end of 2006 she made her first appearance as a solo artist in the show Carolina Todoterreno.

In 2008 she produced the legendary theatrical work Les Misérables at the Teatro Nacional, which earned her the Casandra Award for best work of musical theatre. She returned to produce works as Baño de damas and Rent.

Throughout her career she has performed characters such as Liesl Von Trapp (La novicia rebelde), Norma Cassidy (Victor/Victoria), Eponine (Les Misérables), Roxie Hart (Chicago) and Blancanieves.

In 2010 she made her debut in the world of cinema with the animated film 3 al rescate (3 to the rescue).

Personal life 
Carolina is a vegan.

Filmography

Theatre

Film

Awards and nominations

References

1978 births
Dominican Republic film actresses
Dominican Republic stage actresses
Living people